Muhterem Aras (born 2 January 1966 in Elmaağaç in Bingöl, Turkey) is a German politician of the Alliance '90/The Greens party. She has been a Member of the Landtag of Baden-Württemberg for the constituency Stuttgart I since May 2011, and Landtagspräsidentin (speaker) since May 2016.

Education and profession 
Aras was born in Turkey in the eastern Anatolian village of Elmaağaç, among Alevi Kurds. She moved to Filderstadt in 1978 with her family. After matriculating in Stuttgart, she studied economics at the University of Hohenheim. In 2000 she founded an accounting firm with, at that time, twelve employees in Stuttgart.

Political activity 
Her political career began in 1992 when she entered the Green Party. In 1999,  she was elected to the local council of Stuttgart. From 2007 to 2011, she was parliamentary leader of her party in that council.

In the 2011 Baden-Württemberg state election, she won the Erstmandat ("first mandate") in the Stuttgart I constituency with 42.5% of the votes cast.  In 2011, Aras became the first Muslim woman to enter the Baden-Württemberg Landtag. She was a member of the Committees on Finance and Economic Affairs and of Culture, Youth and Sports and fiscal policy of the Green Party Group.

Since 2014 Aras has been county chair of the Stuttgart District Association of Alliance '90 / The Greens. In 2016 she ran again in Parliamentary constituency of Stuttgart I, and won the mandate with 42.4%, again the nation's best result for her party.

On 11 May 2016, Aras was elected as the new Baden-Württemberg Landtag president with the votes of 96 MPs, becoming the first member of the Greens, the first Muslim, and the first woman, to hold the position.

Aras was nominated by her party as delegate to the Federal Conventions for the purpose of electing the President of Germany in 2022.

Personal life 
Muhterem Aras has been married since 1986 and has a son and a daughter. She is an adherent of the Alevist form of Islam and lives in Stuttgart.

References

External links 
 Internetpräsenz von Muhterem Aras
 Abgeordnetenprofil beim Landtag Baden-Württemberg in der 16. Wahlperdiode. Landtag Baden-Württemberg, retrieved 5 May 2016.
 Profilseite Landtagsfraktion
 Muhterem Aras auf abgeordnetenwatch.de
 Vom anatolischen Mädchen zur schwäbischen Politikerin, Deutsche Islamkonferenz

Alliance 90/The Greens politicians
1966 births
Members of the Landtag of Baden-Württemberg
German people of Kurdish descent
21st-century German politicians
Living people
Kurdish politicians